Tlamess, is a 2019 Tunisian narrative drama film directed by Ala Eddine Slim and co-produced by director himself with Juliette Lepoutre and Pierre Menahem. The film stars Abdullah Miniawy, Souhir Ben Amara, and Khaled Ben Aïssa. The film tells the story of a soldier, who is granted one week's leave after the death of his mother, but he had another target to complete.

The film premiered at the 2019 Cannes Film Festival. It showed in theatres in France starting on 19 February 2020. The film received mixed reviews from critics and screened in many film festivals.

Cast
 Abdullah Miniawy as S
 Souhir Ben Amara as F
 Khaled Ben Aïssa

References

External links 
 

Tunisian drama films
2019 drama films